Homer Hadley Hickam Jr. (born February 19, 1943) is an American author, Vietnam War veteran, and a former NASA engineer who trained the first Japanese astronauts. His 1998 memoir Rocket Boys (also published as October Sky) was a New York Times Best Seller and was the basis for the 1999 film October Sky. Hickam's body of written work also includes several additional best-selling memoirs and novels, including the "Josh Thurlow" historical fiction novels, his 2015 best-selling Carrying Albert Home: The Somewhat True Story of a Man, his Wife, and her Alligator and in 2021 the sequel to Rocket Boys titled Don't Blow Yourself Up: The Further Adventures and Travails of the Rocket Boy of October Sky. His books have been translated into many languages.

Early life and education 
Homer H. Hickam Jr. is the second son of Homer Sr. and Elsie Gardener Hickam (née Lavender). He was born and raised in Coalwood, West Virginia, and graduated from Big Creek High School in 1960. He and friends Roy Lee Cooke, Sherman Siers, Jimmy O'Dell Carroll, Billy Rose, and Quentin Wilson became amateur rocket builders and called themselves The Big Creek Missile Agency (BCMA). After many generations of designs, they qualified for the 1960 National Science Fair and won a gold and silver medal in the area of propulsion.

Virginia Tech and Skipper 
Hickam attended Virginia Tech in 1960 and joined the school's Corps of Cadets. In his junior year, he and a few classmates designed a cannon for football games and school functions. They named the cannon "Skipper" in honor of President John F. Kennedy. Skipper was cast out of brass collected from the cadets and has become an icon for Virginia Tech. Hickam graduated in 1964 with a Bachelor of Science degree in industrial engineering.

Career

Military service (1964–70) 
Hickam served six years in the U.S. Army and was honorably discharged at the rank of captain in 1970. He served in the Vietnam War in 1967 and 1968 as a first lieutenant and combat engineer with C Company, 704th Maintenance Battalion, 4th Infantry Division. He was awarded the Bronze Star Medal, Army Commendation Medal, and Army Meritorious Unit Commendation ribbon.

USAAMC and NASA (1971–98) 
Following his separation from the service, Hickam worked as an engineer for the United States Army Aviation and Missile Command from 1971 to 1978, assigned to Huntsville. Between 1978 and 1981, he was an engineer for the 7th Army Training Command in Germany.

Hickam began employment with the National Aeronautics and Space Administration at Marshall Space Flight Center in 1981 as an aerospace engineer. His specialties included training astronauts in regard to science payloads and extra-vehicular activities (EVA). Additionally, Hickam assisted at the Neutral Buoyancy Simulator as a diver where astronaut crews trained for numerous Spacelab and Space Shuttle missions, including the Hubble Space Telescope deployment, the first two Hubble repair missions, Spacelab-J (with the first Japanese astronauts), and the Solar Max repair mission. Prior to his retirement from NASA in 1998, Hickam was the payload training manager for the International Space Station program.

Literary career 
Hickam began writing in 1969 after returning from serving in the Vietnam War. His first writings were magazine stories about scuba diving and his time as a scuba instructor. Then, having dived in many of the wrecks involved, he wrote about the battle against the U-boats along the American east coast during World War II. This resulted in his first book, Torpedo Junction, a military history best-seller published in 1989 by the Naval Institute Press.

In 1998, Delacorte Press published Hickam's second book, Rocket Boys, the story of his life as the son of a coal miner in Coalwood, West Virginia. Rocket Boys has since been translated into numerous languages and released as an audiobook and electronic book. Among its many honors, it was selected by The New York Times as one of its "Great Books of 1998" and was an alternate "Book-of-the-Month" selection for both the Literary Guild and the Book of the Month Club. Rocket Boys was also nominated by the National Book Critics Circle as Best Biography of 1998. In February 1999, Universal Studios released its critically acclaimed film October Sky, based on Rocket Boys (The title "October Sky" is an anagram of "Rocket Boys"). In an interview, Hickam has said of the movie that it was "fine for what it is, a low-budget feel-good movie, but sadly missed the best parts of my memoir. Still, the world needs feel-good movies and it has done a good job of encouraging young people to go after their dreams." He has since co-written a musical play entitled Rocket Boys the Musical, which, according to Homer Hickam, tells a story closer to the one in his book.

Hickam's first fiction novel was Back to the Moon (1999), which was released as a hardcover, audiobook, and eBook. It has also been translated into Chinese. To date, Back to the Moon is Hickam's only novel specifically about space. It is a techno-thriller and a romantic novel, telling the story of a team of "spacejackers" who commandeer a shuttle.

The Coalwood Way, a memoir of Hickam's hometown, was published a year later by Delacorte Press and is referred to by Hickam as "not a sequel but an equal". His third Coalwood memoir, a true sequel, was published in October 2001. It is entitled Sky of Stone. His final book about Coalwood was published in 2002, a self-help/inspirational tome entitled We Are Not Afraid: Strength and Courage from the Town That Inspired the #1 Bestseller and Award-Winning Movie October Sky.

After his memoir series, Hickam began his popular "Josh Thurlow" series, set during World War II. The first of the series was The Keeper's Son (2003), set on the Outer Banks of North Carolina. The series continued with The Ambassador's Son (2005) and The Far Reaches (2007), both set in the South Pacific.  His next novel was Red Helmet (2008), a love story set in the present-day Appalachian coalfields and dedicated to "Mine Rescue Teams Everywhere." In 2010, he co-authored My Dream of Stars (2010) with Anousheh Ansari, a multi-millionaire Iranian-American who became the world's first female commercial astronaut. Hickam, an avid amateur paleontologist, also wrote The Dinosaur Hunter, a novel set in Montana published by St. Martin's in November 2010.

He also published a young-adult science-fiction thriller trilogy set on the moon, known as the Helium-3 series. It included the titles Crater, Crescent, and The Lunar Rescue Company.

In 2015, Wm Morrow/HarperCollins published his best-selling Carrying Albert Home: The Somewhat True Story of a Man, His Wife, and Her Alligator, which has since been published in 17 languages and won many awards.

In 2021, Hickam published his well-regarded sequel to 'Rocket Boys" titled  Don't Blow Yourself Up: The Further Adventures and Travails of the Rocket Boy of October Sky. The memoir covered the 40 years after the Rocket Boys era including building the iconic cannon at Virginia Tech while a student there, his military service including time as a Lieutenant in the 4th Infantry Division in Vietnam, becoming a scuba instructor, diving on ship wrecks, his recovery efforts of drowned passengers on a river boat in the Tennessee River, his early writing career, working for NASA and training the first Japanese astronauts, being on the Hubble Space Telescope repair crew training team, negotiating with the Russians for the International Space Station, exploring and suffering decompression sickness on the remote Honduran island of Guanaja, writing 'Rocket Boys' and advising the director and producer on set of the movie October Sky and his relationship with Jake Gyllenhaal and the other actors in the film.

In 2016, Hickam sued Universal Studios for fraud and breach of contract over rights to his Rocket Boys sequels, including The Coalwood Way, Sky of Stone, We Are Not Afraid, and Carrying Albert Home. The lawsuit was settled in 2017 to Hickam's satisfaction. A lawsuit in federal court was initiated in 2017 for alleged copyright infringement by the Marriott Theatre in Lincolnshire, Illinois, and its writers and composers of Rocket Boys the Musical, Hickam's musical play based on his memoir Rocket Boys.

Other activities
In May 2013, Hickam opposed a zero tolerance policy at Bartow High School which resulted in the expulsion of a student whose science experiment had caused a small explosion.

In February 2018, Hickam was appointed by Vice President Mike Pence to serve as a member of the Users Advisory Group of the National Space Council, which had been re-established by President Donald Trump in June 2017.

In 2018, Hickam was involved in a controversy when a woman who accepted a position as an intern with NASA replied with profanities towards a comment by Hickam. The Twitter user would have her internship offer revoked as a result of the controversy.

Honors 
In 1984, Hickam was presented with Alabama's Distinguished Service Award for heroism shown during a rescue effort of the crew and passengers of a sunken paddleboat in the Tennessee River. Because of this award, Hickam was honored in 1996 by the United States Olympic Committee to carry the Olympic Torch through Huntsville, Alabama, on its way to Atlanta.

In 1999, the governor of West Virginia issued a proclamation in honor of Hickam for his support of his home state and his distinguished career as both an engineer and author and declared an annual "Rocket Boys Day".

In 2000, the Virginia Tech junior class selected Hickam as the namesake for the Virginia Tech class of 2002 ring collection, the Homer Hickam Collection.

In 2007, Hickam was awarded an honorary doctorate in Literature from Marshall University. That same year, he received the Distinguished Achievement Award from Virginia Tech.

In 2010, Hickam received the Audie Murphy Patriotism Award at the Spirit of America Festival.

In 2013, Hickam won the Clarence Cason Award from the University of Alabama for his non-fiction writing.

In 2014, Hickam won the Appalachian Heritage Writer's Award at Shepherd University.

Books

Coalwood series 
Rocket Boys: A Memoir
The Coalwood Way
Sky of Stone
We Are Not Afraid
Carrying Albert Home
Don't Blow Yourself Up

Josh Thurlow series 
The Keeper's Son
The Ambassador's Son
The Far Reaches
Non-fiction companion volume: Torpedo Junction

Others 
 Back to the Moon: A Novel
 Red Helmet
 Torpedo Junction
 The Dinosaur Hunter
 From Rocket Boys to October Sky An Amazon Kindle Single
 Paco: The Cat Who Meowed in Space An Amazon Kindle Single
 The Helium-3 Trilogy: Crater, Crescent, and The Lunar Rescue Company

References

Further reading 
Dugger, Charles M. Jr. Torpedo Junction: U-Boat War off America's East Coast, 1942. (book review). Sea Frontiers, Jan-Feb 1990. 36(1), 62.
Gates, Anita. Space Cadets: this novel by Homer H. Hickam features an unlikely shuttle crew on its way to the moon (review). The New York Times Review of Books, June 27, 1999. 104(26), pg.19, col.4.
Hickam, Homer H. Jr. Keep Your Faith in Space: A Message to the Next Generation of Rocket Boys and Girls. Ad Astra, May–June 1999. 11(3), 28.
"A Reflection on Rocket Boys/October Sky in the Science Classroom". Journal of College Science Teaching, May 2000. 29(6), 399.
Homer H. Hickam Jr. (aerospace engineer and writer). Current Biography, October 2000. 61(10), 35.
Morgan, Robert. Notes from Underground (Sky of Stone review). The New York Times Book Review, October 21, 2001. 106(42), 22.
Owens, William T. "Country Roads, Hollers, Coal Towns, and Much More". The Social Studies, July 2000. 91(4), 178.
Struckel, Katie. "Remembering with Homer H. Hickam Jr." (interview). Writer's Digest, December 2000. 80(2), 30.
Sturdevant, Rick W. The Infinite Journey: Eyewitness Accounts of NASA and the Age of Space (book review). Air Power History, Winter 2001. 48(4), 59.
We Are Not Afraid: Strength and Courage for Our Nation from the Town of "October Sky" (book review). Publishers' Weekly, January 28, 2002. 249(4), 283.
"We Know Our History (pride in knowing who you are)". Publishers' Weekly, January 14, 2002. 249(2), S1.

External links 

1943 births
Living people
People from McDowell County, West Virginia
Virginia Tech alumni
Novelists from West Virginia
American aerospace engineers
Appalachian writers
NASA people
Space advocates
20th-century American novelists
21st-century American novelists
American male novelists
American science fiction writers
United States Army personnel of the Vietnam War
Engineers from West Virginia
Military personnel from West Virginia
United States Army officers
20th-century American male writers
21st-century American male writers